Senator Bowie may refer to:

Oden Bowie (1826–1894), Maryland State Senate 
Richard Bowie (1807–1881), Maryland State Senate 
Sean Bowie (fl. 2010s), Arizona State Senate
Walter Bowie (1748–1810), Maryland State Senate 
William Duckett Bowie (1803–1873), Maryland State Senate